Ungiminorine is an acetylcholinesterase inhibitor isolated from Narcissus.

References

Acetylcholinesterase inhibitors
Benzodioxoles
Nitrogen heterocycles
Oxygen heterocycles
Heterocyclic compounds with 5 rings
Diols
Ethers